Mukesh Gautam is an Indian film director and works predominantly in Punjabi-language films. He is known for his  movies Ek Noor (2011) and Akhiyaan Udeekdian (2009).  He is also the father of Bollywood actress Yami Gautam and Surilie Gautam. He is currently the vice president of the PTC Punjabi network which he acquired in 2008.

Life
He is father of Yami Gautam and Surilie Gautam.

He has created docudramas on the life and contributions of Baba Sheikh Farid, Baba Bulleh Shah, Waris Shah, noted Punjabi singers Bibi Surinder Kaur, Kuldeep Manak, Ustad Puran Shahkoti, humourist K Deep, singer Gurmeet Bawa, Surjit Bindrakhia, Sarabjit Kokewali, Sartaj etc. He received a  national award from the radio and television fraternity for an outstanding film about Sayyed Waris Shah. Apart from that, he has created around 50 short features on art, culture, history, traditions, rituals and personalities of Punjab. Noteworthy among those are "Origin of Chandigarh", "Gurudwara", "Tradition of Langar", "Punj Kakaar", "Ma Boli", "Chhaju Da Chaubara", "Dhabas on GT Road", "Making of Gur", and noted writer Amrita Pritam.Recently, he has done  short films, based on 'Shaheed Bhagat Singh's Memoires' and 'Faquir Badshah', on the life of Dr Charan Das Sidhu, a legendary figure in Punjabi theatre and literature.
Currently, he is working on two feature films titled 'Shubh Karman' and 'Amazing Rano', which are based on social life & values and sports respectively.

Filmography
Ek Noor (2011)
Akhiyaan Udeekdian (2009)

References

External links
 

Punjabi-language film directors
Film directors from Chandigarh
Living people
People from Chandigarh
Punjabi people
Indian documentary filmmakers
Panjab University alumni
Year of birth missing (living people)